Tecwyn Jones (3 January 1930 – 29 December 2008) was a Welsh professional footballer who played in the Football League for Brentford and Wrexham as a full back. He also played non-League football for Chelmsford City and Dartford.

Career statistics

References

People from Holywell, Flintshire
Sportspeople from Flintshire
Welsh footballers
Association football fullbacks
Brentford F.C. players
English Football League players
1930 births
Wrexham A.F.C. players
2008 deaths
Holywell Town F.C. players

Chelmsford City F.C. players
Dartford F.C. players